Reckless is a British television serial written by Paul Abbott. Produced by Granada Television for the ITV network, it aired in six parts in the UK in 1997.

A two-hour sequel, Reckless: The Sequel, was shown in 1998.

Plot outline
Dr Owen Springer is a surgeon in his thirties, on his way from London to Manchester to move in with his ailing father. On the train journey, Owen needs to make an urgent phone call but the only person who will allow him to use her mobile phone is fellow passenger, Anna Fairley, a beautiful woman in her forties. Unbeknownst to Owen, she is also the head of the management consultancy administering his forthcoming personality assessment for a new job at a local Manchester hospital. By the time of their second meeting, Owen has already developed romantic feelings towards Anna, though she spurns all his advances. To complicate matters further, Owen discovers Anna is also the wife of his new boss at the hospital, Dr Richard Crane. However, Owen discovers Richard is having an affair himself, knowledge which he uses to bring himself and Anna closer together.

Cast
 Owen Springer - Robson Green
 Anna Fairley - Francesca Annis
 Richard Crane - Michael Kitchen
 Arnold Springer - David Bradley
 Vivien Reid - Daniela Nardini
 John McGinley - Conor Mullen
 Danny Glassman - Julian Rhind-Tutt
 Myrtle Fairley - Margery Mason
 Irma - Kathryn Hunt
 Phyllis - Kathryn Pogson
 Michelle - Debra Stephenson

Awards and nominations
BAFTA Television Award - Best Actress - Francesca Annis (nominated)
Royal Television Society Award - Best Writer - Paul Abbott (nominated)
Royal Television Society Award - Best Actor - Robson Green (nominated)
National Television Awards - Most Popular Drama (won)
National Television Awards - Most Popular Actor - Robson Green (nominated)

US Airing
The series was shown in the United States as part of PBS' Masterpiece Theatre. For that airing every two episodes were combined, resulting in only three episodes, each running about 90 mins without commercials (excluding PBS intros).

DVD
Reckless and its sequel are available on DVD, distributed by Acorn Media UK.

External links

1990s British drama television series
ITV television dramas
1997 British television series debuts
1997 British television series endings
1990s British television miniseries
Television series by ITV Studios
Television shows produced by Granada Television
English-language television shows
Television shows set in Manchester